The Doce River (literally the "sweet river") is a river in southeast Brazil with a length of .
The river basin is economically important. In 2015 the collapse of a dam released highly contaminated water from mining into the river, causing an ecological disaster.

Course
The Doce River is formed by the junction of the Piranga and the Carmo  near the historical city of Ouro Preto, whose sources are located in the foothills of the Mantiqueira and Espinhaço mountain chains at altitudes of about 1,200 m. It flows in a northeastern direction via Ipatinga, makes a wide curve near Governador Valadares, and flows in a southeastern direction passing through Conselheiro Pena, to enter the Atlantic Ocean near Linhares in Espírito Santo state. Its main tributaries are the Piracicaba, Casca, Matipó, Caratinga-Cuieté, Manhuaçu, Santo Antônio and Suaçuí Grande, in Minas Gerais; the Pancas, Guandu, and São José, in Espírito Santo.

Part of the river basin is contained in the  Augusto Ruschi Biological Reserve, a fully protected area.
South of the point where the Piracicaba enters the river near Ipatinga the river forms the eastern boundary of the Rio Doce State Park.

Economic value
The Doce river has great economic importance for the region. The basin is home to the largest steel making complex in Latin America. Three of the five largest companies in Minas Gerais state in the year 2000, Companhia Siderúrgica Belgo Mineira, Arcelor Mittal (Acesita) and Usiminas, are located there. The largest open-pit mine in the world is operated in the basin by the Companhia Vale do Rio Doce. These industrial conglomerates have an important role in Brazilian exports of iron ore, steel, and cellulose (Cenibra). In addition, the Doce basin contributes greatly to production of coffee from Minas Gerais and Espírito Santo as well as fruit pulp from Espírito Santo.

Fifteen percent of the GDP of the state of Minas Gerais is produced in the region with the municipality of Ipatinga accounting for 5.4% of that total. Ipatinga is the major city of the Vale do Aço Metropolitan Area.

The economy of the basin is based on the following activities:

 agriculture: dairy and beef cattle, pig raising, coffee, sugar cane, fruits and vegetables and cocoa;
 industry: siderurgy, metallurgy, mechanical, chemical, food, alcohol, textile, leather, paper and paper pulp; and
 mining: iron, gold, bauxite, manganese, and precious stones.

According to the Anuário Estatístico do Brasil (IBGE) the Doce basin has a population of about 3,100,000, with the urban population making up 68.7% of the total population. In recent years the population has declined, with small towns and rural areas losing up to 40% of their population.

Major cities located along the Doce or in its basin are: Timóteo, Coronel Fabriciano, Ipatinga, Governador Valadares, Colatina, and Linhares.

Climate
According to the Koppen classification, there are three climatic types in the Doce basin:
Tropical with altitude climate with summer rains and cool summers, present on the slopes of the Mantiqueira and the Espinhaço Mountains and at the sources of the Doce river.
Tropical with altitude climate with summer rains and hot summers, present at the sources of its tributaries.
Hot climate with summer rains, present in the middle and lower sections of the Doce and its tributaries.

Environmental disaster

On 5 November 2015, a mine dam holding back waste water from an iron ore mine in Mariana, South-Eastern Brazil, owned by Samarco, a joint venture between Vale and BHP Billiton, collapsed, devastating a nearby town with mudslides, killing at least 17 people, injuring more than 50 and causing an enormous ecological damage, and threatening life along the Rio Doce and the Atlantic sea near the mouth of the Rio Doce. About 60 million cubic meters of iron waste flowed into the Doce River. Toxic brown mudflows reached the Atlantic Ocean 17 days later.

References

External links

Map of Doce and Jequitinhonha Rivers Copied from Documents Found in the House of Representatives from the 19th century. 

Rivers of Espírito Santo
Rivers of Minas Gerais